Arriva North West is a major bus operator running services in North West England primarily in the Merseyside area and the county of Cheshire. It is a subsidiary of Arriva UK Bus.

History

Arriva North West was originally formed following the split of Ribble Motor Services in preparation for privatisation in 1986, with the operations in Merseyside, West Lancashire and Wigan trading as North Western. The name was taken from the former North Western operations, which ran between 1923 and 1976. In 1988 the North Western operations were sold to Drawlane who was later sold to British Bus, who also took over the operations of the Bee Line Buzz Company, who ran services in Greater Manchester. In 1996, British Bus was bought by the Cowie Group. In November 1997 Cowie was rebranded as Arriva with North Western becoming Arriva North West in 1998.

In February 2000, Arriva North West purchased MTL Trust Holdings, which created a larger presence in the Merseyside area and more than doubled the size of the company. In 2002, Arriva North West merged with Arriva Buses Wales to form Arriva North West & Wales. Three former Arriva Midlands depots in Crewe, Macclesfield and Winsford were transferred into the North West & Wales operation, although Crewe closed in December 2005.

In July 2005, Arriva purchased Blue Bus & Coach Services for £2.9 million, which almost doubled their presence in Greater Manchester. In January 2009, the Wales operation was split from Arriva North West as Arriva Buses Wales with the Arriva North West name resurrected for the North West England operations.

Although the company is officially known as Arriva North West, some operations were originally registered under alternative Arriva names. Former Bee Line operations were registered as Arriva Manchester, some Liverpool operations and the former Blue Bus operations were registered as Arriva Liverpool. As of Autumn 2011 a large proportion of services in Merseyside remain registered under the separate Arriva Merseyside licence, all other services are registered under the Arriva North West licence.

Operating centres
The company has depots in:

Birkenhead - Laird Street
Bolton - Folds Road
Bootle - Hawthorne Road
Liverpool (Stoneycroft) - Green Lane
Liverpool (Speke) - Shaw Road (sometimes referred to as Woodend Avenue)
Macclesfield - Lyme Green - Gaw End Lane (now regarded as an outstation of Winsford)
Runcorn - Beechwood Avenue
St Helens - Jackson Street
Southport - Canning Road
Winsford - Road Four, Winsford Industrial Estate
Wythenshawe (Manchester) - Greeba Road, Roundthorn Industrial Estate

Arriva North West announced in February 2022 that it may close its Macclesfield and Winsford depots, as a result of garages not turning profits since before the Covid-19 pandemic, a lack of ridership and funding following the pandemic, and severe driver shortages at Winsford depot.

Past depots, now closed or sold, have included:

Crewe - Delamere Street (closed December 2005)
Gillmoss - East Lancashire Road (sold to Glenvale Transport in July 2001 in response to a Competition Commission requirement)
Huyton - Wilson Road (closed 2006)
Manchester - St Andrew's Square (near Manchester Piccadilly station (closed March 2012)
Skelmersdale - Neverstitch Road (closed 23 July 2011)
Warrington - Athlone Road (closed February 2002)

Fleet
As at April 2019, the fleet consists of approximately 798 active vehicles. A wide variety of makes and types are represented, although DAF and VDL chassis predominate, accounting for around 58% of the fleet, and over half of the fleet carries bodywork by Wrightbus. The fleet is about 54% single-deck and entirely low-floor. Arriva stated its intention to make its main routes serving Liverpool completely low-floor by 2008 and similarly for the whole of Merseyside by 2011.

Fleet summary

Double deck

On the double-deck side of the fleet, 51 Volvo B5LH hybrids with Wright Gemini 3 bodywork entered service at Green Lane and Speke depots in early 2017, after initial use on rail replacement services. Other recent deliveries include 128 Alexander Dennis Enviro400s which entered service at Bootle, Green Lane, Speke, St Helens and Southport depots in between mid 2014 and mid 2015. With 152 examples overall, the Enviro400 is the most common double deck type in the fleet.

Other deliveries include 44 Volvo B5LH hybrids with Wright Eclipse Gemini 2 bodywork, which were the first hybrid double deckers in the fleet, entered service at Bolton and Birkenhead depots in spring 2013, with eleven delivered to Bolton and 33 delivered to Birkenhead for "CrossRiver" branded services.

A total of 47 brand new VDL DB300s with Wright Gemini 2 bodywork were delivered to Speke and Winsford depots towards the end of 2011 and early 2012, with the bulk of the order, 44 buses, going to Speke depot. Prior to this, 35 Alexander Dennis Enviro400s entered service in 2009, mainly displacing Volvo Olympians. 23 of the Enviro400s were allocated to Birkenhead for services through the Mersey Tunnels, these being the first vehicles in the fleet to carry the "Interurban" livery, apart from a solitary demonstrator. The other twelve were for services between Bootle and Aigburth Vale.

Previously, 30 Volvo B7TLs with Alexander ALX400 bodywork had entered service on routes between Liverpool and Garston in 2006, marking the end of a 7½ year hiatus of new double-deckers.

Single deck

The standard single deck vehicle in the fleet is the VDL SB200 with Commander, Pulsar and Pulsar 2 bodywork; between them, these types now make up nearly two thirds (59%) of the single deck fleet. The second most prominent single deck type is the VDL SB120 with Plaxton Centro and Wright Cadet bodywork. Another type in the fleet is the Wright-bodied Volvo B10BLE, with two still in service in late 2017. The Dennis Dart, which once made up a significant part of the fleet, is no longer in use with Arriva North West, with the last example being withdrawn in 2017. 

Other new single deck deliveries since 2007 were ten Alexander Dennis Enviro300s for Wythenshawe depot, four Alexander Dennis Enviro200 Darts for the Southport Park and Ride routes, fifteen "classic" Optare Solos, 26 Optare Solo SRs, 24 Mercedes-Benz Sprinter minibuses, nineteen MAN EcoCity gas powered buses, twelve BYD D9UR battery powered buses and six integral Wright StreetLite Maxes.

Unusual vehicles

Unusual vehicles in the fleet included four MAN 14.220s with East Lancs Myllennium bodywork which were based at Bolton depot. Until October 2008, twelve Neoplan N4016 were operating on service 18A from Liverpool to Croxteth Park, and were the only vehicles of their type in Britain, as were a batch of three Neoplan N4009s, which were latterly based at Bootle depot. Until early 2016, a batch of three Ikarus Polaris bodied DAF SB220s were operated on services in and around Bolton. These were the remaining examples out of seven that were acquired with the Blue Bus fleet, which accounted for a majority of those which were imported into the United Kingdom.

In 2011, Speke depot received a total of ten Mercedes-Benz Citaro articulated buses from Arriva London. Two branded vehicles arrived for use on the AirLink 501 route in June 2011, and from September 2011, a further eight standard livery examples found use on service 699 between the University of Liverpool and Carnatic Halls. In November 2011, articulated vehicles were first used on the AirLink 500 route between Liverpool city centre and Liverpool John Lennon Airport. These vehicles left the fleet in 2014.

In November 2017, a batch of twelve BYD Alexander Dennis Enviro200EV battery electric buses entered service at Green Lane depot on services 26 and 27, becoming both the first fully electric powered vehicles operated by Arriva North West and the first Enviro200EVs to be delivered to an operator in the United Kingdom outside London.

See also
List of bus operators of the United Kingdom

References

External links

Arriva North West website

North West
Transport in Cheshire
Bus operators in Greater Manchester
Transport in Liverpool
Transport in Manchester
Bus operators in Cheshire
Bus operators in Merseyside